The following radio stations broadcast on FM frequency 92.5 MHz:

Argentina
 Boreal in Capilla del Señor, Buenos Aires
 LRM749 in Santa Fe, Santa Fe (is has 92.3 FM assigned)
 FM 92.5 in Villa Gobernador Gálvez, Santa Fe
 LRI757 FM92 in Roldán, Santa Fe
 Frecuencia Zero in Buenos Aires
 LRP760 Hersilia in Hersilia, Santa Fe
 Laser in Santa Fe de la Vera Cruz, Santa Fe
 Latina in Salta
 Okey in General Arenales, Buenos Aires
 Radio Maria in Ayacucho, Buenos Aires
 Radio Maria in Pergamino, Buenos Aires
 Radio Maria in San Carlos de Bolívar, Buenos Aires
 Radio Maria in Curuzú Cuatiá, Corrientes
 Radio Maria in Clorinda, Formosa
 Radio Maria in Caucete, San Juan
 Radio María in Joaquín V. González, Salta
 Signos in Munro, Buenos Aires
 Tiempo in Piamonte, Santa Fe
 Vida in Fortín Olmos, Santa Fe

Australia
 ABC Central Coast in Gosford, New South Wales 
 7PB in Launceston, Tasmania
 Radio National in Hamilton, Victoria

Canada (Channel 223)
 CBCD-FM in Pembroke, Ontario
 CBGC-FM in Carmanville, Newfoundland and Labrador
 CBSI-FM-7 in Havre-Saint-Pierre, Quebec
 CBUW-FM in Powell River, British Columbia
 CFBX-FM in Kamloops, British Columbia
 CFEA-FM in Nikamo, Quebec
 CKKS-FM-1 in Abbotsford, British Columbia
 CHFA-3-FM in Peace River, Alberta
 CHUT-FM-1 in Val-d'Or, Quebec
 CIAM-FM-8 in Charlie Lake, British Columbia
 CILX-FM in Ile-a-la-Crosse, Saskatchewan
 CIOG-FM-1 in Summerside, Prince Edward Island
 CJLC-FM in Prince Albert, Saskatchewan 
 CJMM-FM-1 in La Sarre, Quebec
 CJRH-FM in Waskaganish, Quebec
 CJSE-FM-1 in Memramcook, New Brunswick
 CJUC-FM in Whitehorse, Yukon
 CKAJ-FM in Saguenay, Quebec
 CKBE-FM in Montreal, Quebec
 CKBI-FM-1 in Big River, Saskatchewan
 CKIS-FM in Toronto, Ontario
 CKJM-FM-1 in Pomquet, Nova Scotia
 CKKN-FM-1 in McLeod, British Columbia
 CKNG-FM in Edmonton, Alberta
 VF2484 in Kemess Mine, British Columbia
 VF2530 in Granisle, British Columbia
 VF2538 in Nelson, British Columbia
 VF2552 in Tofino, British Columbia

China 
 CNR Music Radio in Tianjin

El Salvador
YSBC at Ciudad Barrios
YSCC at Usulután
YSEN at Ahuachapán
YSEU at Santa Ana
YSIC at Chirilagua
YSIR at La Unión
YSLK at Cuisnahuat
YSLL at Acajutla
YSNG at Nueva Guadalupe
YSQQ at San Salvador
YSRN at Jalacatal
YSSA at Sonsonate
YSSR at Santa Rosa de Lima
YSTT at Chinameca
YSVG at San Francisco Gotera

Japan
 NHK Radio 1 in Sukumo, Kochi

Malaysia
Radio Klasik in Kuala Terengganu, Terengganu

Mexico
 XHANS-FM in Bahía Asunción, Baja California Sur
 XHEFO-FM in Chihuahua, Chihuahua
 XHETD-FM in Tecuala, Nayarit
 XHFRT-FM in Comitán de Dominguez, Chiapas
 XHGQ-FM in Los Reyes de Salgado, Michoacán
 XHGX-FM in Cuartel de Pozos, Guanajuato
 XHIC-FM in Campeche, Campeche
 XHLMS-FM in Los Mochis, Sinaloa
 XHPCHI-FM in Chilpancingo, Guerrero
 XHPEDM-FM in Cuatro Ciénegas, Coahuila
 XHPJOS-FM in José María Morelos, Quintana Roo
 XHPK-FM in Pachuca, Hidalgo
 XHQRV-FM in Veracruz (El Pando), Veracruz
 XHRJ-FM in Toluca, Estado de México
 XHRM-FM in Tijuana, Baja California
 XHRRT-FM in Tampico, Tamaulipas
 XHSAG-FM in Salamanca, Guanajuato
 XHSCFI-FM in San Lorenzo Cacaotepec, Oaxaca
 XHSIBG-FM in Júpare, Huatabampo Municipality, Sonora
 XHSRO-FM in Monterrey, Nuevo León
 XHTR-FM in Villahermosa, Tabasco
 XHUU-FM in Colima, Colima
 XHZM-FM in Puebla, Puebla

New Zealand
 Radio New Zealand Concert in Wellington

Philippines
 DXKG in Koronadal

Serbia
Play Radio at Belgrade.

United States (Channel 223)
  in Butte, Montana
  in Richmond, Missouri
 KBEB in Sacramento, California
 KBEY in Burnet, Texas
 KBXI in Park City, Montana
 KCAN-LP in Needles, California
  in Groves, Texas
 KCRT-FM in Trinidad, Colorado
 KCUA in Maeser, Utah
  in Silver Lake, Kansas
 KELE-FM in Mountain Grove, Missouri
 KFGD-LP in Fresno, California
 KGEL-LP in Jasper, Oregon
 KGYS-LP in Dewitt, Iowa
  in Arcadia, Louisiana
 KHGF-LP in Houston, Texas
  in Wake Village, Texas
 KIVE-LP in Aurora, Nebraska
 KJID-LP in Tyler, Texas
 KJJG-LP in South Houston, Texas
 KJJY in West Des Moines, Iowa
  in Paso Robles, California
  in Markham, Texas
  in Hollis, Oklahoma
 KKSE-FM in Broomfield, Colorado
 KKWQ in Warroad, Minnesota
 KLAD-FM in Klamath Falls, Oregon
  in Kahului, Hawaii
 KMAC-LP in Muscatine, Iowa
 KMWX in Abilene, Texas
 KMXW in Douglas, Wyoming
  in Arvin, California
 KMZR in Atwater, California
 KNKJ-LP in Red Bluff, California
 KOMA (FM) in Oklahoma City, Oklahoma
 KOWS-LP in Occidental, California
  in Poplar Bluff, Missouri
  in Havre, Montana
 KPRV-FM in Heavener, Oklahoma
 KQLH-LP in Yucaipa, California
  in Phillipsburg, Kansas
  in Bellevue, Washington
  in Golden Valley, Minnesota
 KRPT in Devine, Texas
 KRWN in Farmington, New Mexico
 KSJC-LP in Silverton, Colorado
  in Winona, Minnesota
 KSRW (FM) in Independence, California
  in Joplin, Missouri
  in Eagar, Arizona
 KTWB in Sioux Falls, South Dakota
  in South Jordan, Utah
 KVLR in Sunset Valley, Texas
 KVPI-FM in Ville Platte, Louisiana
 KWIX-FM in Cairo, Missouri
 KWQR in Willcox, Arizona
 KWUP in Navasota, Texas
 KWYN-FM in Wynne, Arkansas
 KXJX-LP in Clinton, Iowa
  in Park Rapids, Minnesota
 KXXE in San Augustine, Texas
 KYVD-LP in Yuma, Arizona
  in Dayton, Washington
 KZPS in Dallas, Texas
 WAIW in Winchester, Virginia
 WAJB-LP in Wellston, Ohio
  in Rochester, New York
  in Marlette, Michigan
 WBKR in Owensboro, Kentucky
  in Black River, New York
 WCKN in Moncks Corner, South Carolina
 WCLR in DeKalb, Illinois
  in Alliance, Ohio
 WDKM in Poultney, Vermont
 WEFA-LP in Ocala, Florida
 WEIM-LP in West Liberty, Kentucky
  in Zebulon, Georgia
  in Greenville, South Carolina
  in Baldwyn, Mississippi
 WFDX in Atlanta, Michigan
 WFSX-FM in Estero, Florida
 WGVV-LP in Rock Island, Illinois
 WIBF in Mexico, Pennsylvania
  in Buhl, Minnesota
 WISY-LP in Black Earth, Wisconsin
  in Tomahawk, Wisconsin
  in Ashley, Michigan
  in Jacksonville Beach, Florida
  in Conklin, New York
 WKXQ (FM) in Rushville, Illinois
  in Tifton, Georgia
 WLCJ-LP in Marinette, Wisconsin
 WMBZ (FM) in West Bend, Wisconsin
 WNDD in Alachua, Florida
 WNKZ-FM in Pocomoke City, Maryland
  in Cincinnati, Ohio
  in Corozal, Puerto Rico
 WPAP in Panama City, Florida
  in Indiana, Pennsylvania
  in Forest, Mississippi
  in Ocean Springs, Mississippi
 WRBP-LP in Wisconsin Rapids, Wisconsin
  in Urbana, Illinois
 WRYC in Frisco City, Alabama
 WSAB-LP in Jamestown, Tennessee
 WTHM-LP in Ravenswood, West Virginia
  in Toledo, Ohio
  in Trinity, Alabama
 WWPV-LP in Colchester, Vermont
 WWSN in Newaygo, Michigan
 WWYZ in Waterbury, Connecticut
  in Andover, Massachusetts
  in Philadelphia, Pennsylvania
 WYDE-FM in Cordova, Alabama
  in Henderson, North Carolina
 WYRF-LP in Florence, South Carolina
  in Safety Harbor, Florida
  in Danville, West Virginia
  in Mattawan, Michigan
 WZWZ in Kokomo, Indiana

Vietnam
 Binh Duong radio, Binh Duong province

References

Lists of radio stations by frequency